A Man Under the Influence is the fifth studio album by the American singer-songwriter Alejandro Escovedo, released on April 24, 2001, on Bloodshot Records. It was produced by Chris Stamey. A deluxe edition was released on November 15, 2009.

Critical reception

Billboard wrote that A Man Under the Influence was "the best studio performance Escovedo has ever delivered". Similarly, Joshua Klein wrote in The A.V. Club that the album "could be Escovedo's best yet", and James Mann said in PopMatters that the album was "far and away his best work".

Several critics also commended Stamey's production on the album: Joe Tangari wrote in Pitchfork that on the track "Velvet Guitar", his production "keeps [the five guitarists on that track] all in their respective places, avoiding a sloppy mess." Additionally, Raoul Hernandez wrote in The Austin Chronicle that Stamey "deserves credit for the LP's overall cohesion of sound", while Michael Barclay of Exclaim! wrote that Stamey's production "captures the mood perfectly".

Conversely, Robert Christgau of The Village Voice selected "Wave" and "Castanets" as "choice cuts", indicating good songs "on an album that isn't worth your time or money."

Track listing
All tracks composed by Alejandro Escovedo; except where indicated
"Wave"
"Rosalie"
"Rhapsody" (Escovedo, Stephen Barber)
"Across the River"
"Castanets"
"Don't Need You"
"Follow You Down" (Escovedo, Stephen Barber)
"Wedding Day" (Escovedo, JD Foster)
"Velvet Guitar"
"As I Fall"
"About This Love"

Personnel
Alejandro Escovedo - acoustic guitar, electric guitar, vocals
Ryan Adams	- vocal harmony, backing vocals
Lynn Blakey	- vocal harmony, backing vocals
Caitlin Cary	- violin, backing vocals
Tonya Lamm	- vocal harmony, backing vocals
Michael "Cornbread" Traylor	- bass
Mike Daly	- bass, 12-string electric guitar, acoustic guitar, mando-guitar, mandolin, pedal steel
Mitch Easter	- electric guitar, engineer
Eric Heywood	- pedal steel, pump organ, vocal harmony
Joe Eddy Hines	- electric guitar, slide guitar
Hector Muñoz	- drums, orchestral percussion, tambourine
Aaron Oliva	- bowed double bass, double bass
David Perales	- violin, vocal harmony
Chip Robinson	- vocal harmony, backing vocals
Chris Stamey	- bass, acoustic guitar, baritone guitar, electric guitar, Kurzweil synthesizer, sleigh bells, engineer
Brian Standefer - cello
Jon Wurster	- shaker
Technical
John Plymale, Tim Harper	- mixing
Markus Greiner - design
Dana Lee Smith	- artwork

References

Alejandro Escovedo albums
2001 albums
Bloodshot Records albums
Albums produced by Chris Stamey